The Rubik's Cube is the original and best known of the three-dimensional sequential move puzzles. There have been many virtual implementations of this puzzle in software. It is a natural extension to create sequential move puzzles in more than three dimensions. Although no such puzzle could ever be physically constructed, the rules of how they operate are quite rigorously defined mathematically and are analogous to the rules found in three-dimensional geometry. Hence, they can be simulated by software. As with the mechanical sequential move puzzles, there are records for solvers, although not yet the same degree of competitive organisation.

Glossary

Vertex. A zero-dimensional point at which higher-dimension figures meet.
Edge. A one-dimensional figure at which higher-dimension figures meet.
Face. A two-dimensional figure at which (for objects of dimension greater than three) higher-dimension figures meet.
Cell. A three-dimensional figure at which (for objects of dimension greater than four) higher-dimension figures meet.
n-Polytope. A n-dimensional figure continuing as above. A specific geometric shape may replace polytope where this is appropriate, such as 4-cube to mean the tesseract.
n-cell. A higher-dimension figure containing n cells.
Piece. A single moveable part of the puzzle having the same dimensionality as the whole puzzle.
Cubie. In the solving community this is the term generally used for a 'piece'.
Sticker. The coloured labels on the puzzle which identify the state of the puzzle. For instance, the corner cubies of a Rubik's cube are a single piece but each has three stickers. The stickers in higher-dimensional puzzles will have a dimensionality greater than two. For instance, in the 4-cube, the stickers are three-dimensional solids.

For comparison purposes, the data relating to the standard 33 Rubik's cube is as follows;

Number of achievable combinations  

There is some debate over whether the face-centre cubies should be counted as separate pieces as they cannot be moved relative to each other. A different number of pieces may be given in different sources. In this article the face-centre cubies are counted as this makes the arithmetical sequences more consistent and they can certainly be rotated, a solution of which requires algorithms. However, the cubie right in the middle is not counted because it has no visible stickers and hence requires no solution. Arithmetically we should have

 

But P is always one short of this (or the n-dimensional extension of this formula) in the figures given in this article because C (or the corresponding highest-dimension polytope, for higher dimensions) is not being counted.

Magic 4D Cube

Geometric shape: tesseract

The Superliminal MagicCube4D software implements many twisty puzzle versions of 4D polytopes including N4 cubes. The UI allows for 4D twists and rotations plus control of 4D viewing parameters such as the projection into 3D, cubie size and spacing, and sticker size.

Superliminal Software maintains a Hall of Fame for record breaking solvers of this puzzle.

34 4-cube

Achievable combinations:

24 4-cube

Achievable combinations:

44 4-cube

Achievable combinations:

54 4-cube

Achievable combinations:

Magic 5D Cube

Geometric shape: penteract

The Gravitation3d Magic 5D Cube software is capable of rendering 5-cube puzzles in six sizes from 25 to 75. As well as the ability to make moves on the cube there are controls to change the view. These include controls for rotating the cube in 3-space, 4-space and 5-space, 4-D and 5-D perspective controls, cubie and sticker spacing and size controls, similar to Superliminal's 4D cube.

However, a 5-D puzzle is much more difficult to comprehend on a 2-D screen than a 4-D puzzle is. An essential feature of the Gravitation3d implementation is the ability to turn off or highlight chosen cubies and stickers. Even so, the complexities of the images produced are still quite severe, as can be seen from the screenshots.

Gravitation3d maintains a Hall of Insanity for record breaking solvers of this puzzle. As of 6 January 2011, there have been two successful solutions for the 75 size of 5-cube.

35 5-cube

Achievable combinations:

25 5-cube

Achievable combinations:

45 5-cube

Achievable combinations:

55 5-cube

Achievable combinations:

65 5-cube

Achievable combinations:

75 5-cube

Achievable combinations:

Magic Cube 7D 
Geometric shape: hexeract (6D) and hepteract (7D)

Andrey Astrelin's Magic Cube 7D software is capable of rendering puzzles of up to 7 dimensions in twelve sizes from 34 to 57.

As of May 2016, only the 36, 37, 46, and 56 puzzles have been solved.

Magic 120-cell

Geometric shape: 120-cell (also called the hecatonicosachoron or dodecacontachoron)

The 120-cell is a 4-D geometric figure (4-polytope) composed of 120 dodecahedra, which in turn is a 3-D figure composed of 12 pentagons. The 120-cell is the 4-D analogue of the dodecahedron in the same way that the tesseract (4-cube) is the 4-D analogue of the cube. The 4-D 120-cell software sequential move puzzle from Gravitation3d is therefore the 4-D analogue of the Megaminx, 3-D puzzle, which has the shape of a dodecahedron.

The puzzle is rendered in only one size, that is three cubies on a side, but in six colouring schemes of varying difficulty. The full puzzle requires a different colour for each cell, that is 120 colours. This large number of colours adds to the difficulty of the puzzle in that some shades are quite difficult to tell apart. The easiest form is two interlocking tori, each torus forming a ring of cubies in different dimensions. The full list of colouring schemes is as follows;
2-colour tori.
9-colour 4-cube cells. That is, the same colouring scheme as the 4-cube.
9-colour layers.
12-colour rings.
60-colour antipodal. Each pair of diametrically opposed dodecahedron cells is the same colour.
120-colour full puzzle.

The controls are very similar to the 4-D Magic Cube with controls for 4-D perspective, cell size, sticker size and distance and the usual zoom and rotation. Additionally, there is the ability to completely turn off groups of cells based on selection of tori, 4-cube cells, layers or rings.

Gravitation3d has created a "Hall of Fame" for solvers, who must provide a log file for their solution. As of April 2017, the puzzle has been solved twelve times.

Achievable combinations:

 

 

This calculation of achievable combinations has not been mathematically proven and can only be considered an upper bound. Its derivation assumes the existence of the set of algorithms needed to make all the "minimal change" combinations. There is no reason to suppose that these algorithms will not be found since puzzle solvers have succeeded in finding them on all similar puzzles that have so far been solved.

3x3 2D square

Geometric shape: square

A 2-D Rubik type puzzle can no more be physically constructed than a 4-D one can. A 3-D puzzle could be constructed with no stickers on the third dimension which would then behave as a 2-D puzzle but the true implementation of the puzzle remains in the virtual world. The implementation shown here is from Superliminal who  call it the 2D Magic Cube.

The puzzle is not of any great interest to solvers as its solution is quite trivial. In large part this is because it is not possible to put a piece in position with a twist. Some of the most difficult algorithms on the standard Rubik's Cube are to deal with such twists where a piece is in its correct position but not in the correct orientation. With higher-dimension puzzles this twisting can take on the rather disconcerting form of a piece being apparently inside out. One has only to compare the difficulty of the 2×2×2 puzzle with the 3×3 (which has the same number of pieces) to see that this ability to cause twists in higher dimensions has much to do with difficulty, and hence satisfaction with solving, the ever popular Rubik's Cube.

Achievable combinations:

 

The centre pieces are in a fixed orientation relative to each other (in exactly the same way as the centre pieces on the standard 3×3×3 cube) and hence do not figure in the calculation of combinations.

This puzzle is not really a true 2-dimensional analogue of the Rubik's Cube. If the group of operations on a single polytope of an n-dimensional puzzle is defined as any rotation of an (n – 1)-dimensional polytope in (n – 1)-dimensional space then the size of the group,

for the 5-cube is rotations of a 4-polytope in 4-space = 8×6×4 = 192,
for the 4-cube is rotations of a 3-polytope (cube) in 3-space = 6×4 = 24,
for the 3-cube is rotations of a 2-polytope (square) in 2-space = 4
for the 2-cube is rotations of a 1-polytope in 1-space = 1

In other words, the 2D puzzle cannot be scrambled at all if the same restrictions are placed on the moves as for the real 3D puzzle. The moves actually given to the 2D Magic Cube are the operations of reflection. This reflection operation can be extended to higher-dimension puzzles. For the 3D cube the analogous operation would be removing a face and replacing it with the stickers facing into the cube. For the 4-cube, the analogous operation is removing a cube and replacing it inside-out.

1D projection

Another alternate-dimension puzzle is a view achievable in David Vanderschel's Magic Cube 3D. A 4-cube projected on to a 2D computer screen is an example of a general type of an n-dimensional puzzle projected on to a (n – 2)-dimensional space. The 3D analogue of this is to project the cube on to a 1-dimensional representation, which is what Vanderschel's program is capable of doing.

Vanderschel bewails that nobody has claimed to have solved the 1D projection of this puzzle. However, since records are not being kept for this puzzle it might not actually be the case that it is unsolved.

See also

Rubik's Cube group
List of Rubik's Cube software
List of four dimensional games

References

Further reading

H. J. Kamack and T. R. Keane, The Rubik Tesseract, available online here and archived 25 December 2008.
Velleman, D, "Rubik's Tesseract", Mathematics Magazine, Vol. 65, No. 1 (February 1992), pp. 27–36, Mathematical Association of America.
Pickover, C, Surfing Through Hyperspace, pp120–122, Oxford University Press, 1999.
Pickover, C, Alien IQ Test, Chapter 24, Dover Publications, 2001.
Pickover, C, The Zen of Magic Squares, Circles, and Stars, pp130–133, Princeton University Press, 2001.
David Singmaster, Computer Cubists, June 2001. A list maintained by Singmaster, including 4D references. Retrieved 19 June 2008.

External links
Superliminal
Gravitation3d's Anatomy of a d-dimensional Rubik's Cube
David Vanderschel's 3D Magic Cube

Combination puzzles
Multi-dimensional geometry